Donald Austin "Donny" Toia (born May 28, 1992) is an American soccer player who plays for FC Tucson in USL League One.

Career

Real Salt Lake
Toia got his start with the Tucson Soccer Academy as a forward, and at the end of his youth career with then, signed with Real Salt Lake as the club's first homegrown player in March 2011 after spending two years in their youth system.  However, in February 2012, Toia was released by the club without ever making a first team appearance.

FC Tucson
Following his release from Real Salt Lake, Toia joined FC Tucson in the USL Premier Development League where he made 15 appearances for the club during the 2012 season. Toia scored the first goal in FC Tucson history on May 5, 2012, during a 2–1 loss to Fresno Fuego FC.

Phoenix FC
In February 2013, Toia signed with USL Pro club Phoenix FC for the inaugural season. He made his professional debut on March 23 in the club's inaugural match, a 2–0 loss to Los Angeles Blues. Toia finished the season with 6 goals to lead the team and was a nominee for USL Pro Rookie of the Year. He was voted player of the season by La Furia Roja 1881, the club's supporters group.

Return to MLS
Toia signed with Major League Soccer club Chivas USA in January 2014.
After Chivas folded in November 2014, Toia was selected in the 2014 MLS Dispersal Draft by the Montreal Impact. He earned even more playing time in Canada, taking over as the Impact's starting left back. He was selected 1st overall in the 2016 MLS Expansion Draft by Atlanta United FC, after which he was promptly traded to Orlando City for the eighth overall pick in the 2017 MLS SuperDraft. He was released by Orlando at the end of the 2018 season.

On December 14, 2018, Toia re-joined Real Salt Lake after being selected in the 2018 MLS Re-Entry Draft. Following the 2021 season, Toia's contract option was declined by Salt Lake.

Return to FC Tucson
Toia returned to FC Tucson, now in USL League One, on June 16, 2022.

International career
Toia has represented the United States at U18 and U20 youth levels.

Career statistics

Club

Honors

 Canadian Championship: (1) – 2014

References

External links

1992 births
Living people
American soccer players
Association football forwards
Chivas USA players
FC Tucson players
Phoenix FC players
Major League Soccer players
CF Montréal players
Orlando City SC players
Real Salt Lake players
Soccer players from Tucson, Arizona
USL Championship players
USL League One players
United States men's youth international soccer players
United States men's under-20 international soccer players
USL League Two players
Real Monarchs players
Homegrown Players (MLS)